Trichoderma hamatum is a species of fungus in the family Hypocreaceae. It has been used a biological control of certain plant diseases.

References

External links
 
 

Trichoderma
Biopesticides
Biotechnology
Biological pest control
Fungi described in 1906